Virginia Manzano (November 24, 1912 – February 18, 1985) was a Mexican film actress.

Selected filmography
 The Eternal Secret (1942)
 The Rock of Souls (1943)
 María Eugenia (1943)
 The Two Orphans (1944)
 Mischievous Susana (1945)

References

Bibliography
 Pitts, Michael R. Western Movies: A Guide to 5,105 Feature Films. McFarland, 2012.

External links

1912 births
1985 deaths
20th-century Mexican actresses
Mexican film actresses
Mexican stage actresses
Actresses from Guadalajara, Jalisco